The Flight Design Twin is a German two-place, paraglider that was designed by Michaël Hartmann and Stefan Müller and produced by Flight Design of Landsberied. It is now out of production.

Design and development
The aircraft was designed as a tandem glider for flight training. Test flying was carried out by factory test pilot Richard Bergmann.

The glider is DHV 1-2 Biplace certified.

The design progressed through three generations of models, the Twin, Twin 2 and Twin 3, each improving on the last.

Specifications (Twin 3)

References

Twin
Paragliders